Legal Bootleg Series: 14 Sept 2002 Metro, Chicago is a live album by English rock band Wire. It was released in 2010.

Track listing 

 "99.9"
 "Germ Ship"
 "Mr. Marx's Table"
 "1st Fast"
 "Read & Burn"
 "The Agfers of Kodack"
 "Comet"
 "In the Art of Stopping"
 "Spent"
 "I Don't Understand"

References

External links 

 Legal Bootleg Series: 14 Sept 2002 Metro, Chicago at Wire's official website

2010 live albums
Wire (band) live albums
Self-released albums